Sep'o County is a kun, or county, in Kangwŏn province, North Korea.  It was created as a separate entity following the division of Korea.

Physical features
The county is primarily mountainous, and is traversed by the Masingryŏng and Kwangju ranges. There are numerous mountains outside of these two ranges as well. The chief streams include the Namdaech'ŏn, Yongjich'ŏn, and Komitanch'ŏn (고미탄천).  75% of the county's area is occupied by forestland.

Administrative divisions
Sep'o county is divided into 1 ŭp (town), 1 rodongjagu (workers' district) and 24 ri (villages):

Economy
Sep'o is host to deposits of molybdenum, silver, zinc, and fluorite.  Agriculture also contributes to the local economy; Sepo is particularly known for its radishes.  In addition, livestock raising and orcharding play a role, and there is some small-scale manufacturing as well.

Transport
Sep'o county is served by several stations on the Kangwŏn and Ch'ŏngnyŏn Ich'ŏn lines of the Korean State Railway, including Sep'o Ch'ŏngnyŏn station in Sep'o-ŭp, which is the junction point of the two lines.

See also
Geography of North Korea
Administrative divisions of North Korea
Kangwon (North Korea)

References

External links

Counties of Kangwon Province (North Korea)